Phillips Creek is a  long 2nd order tributary to the Cape Fear River in Bladen County, North Carolina.

Course
Phillips Creek rises in Bakers Lake about 5 miles northeast of Newlight, North Carolina. Phillips Creek then flows south to join the Cape Fear River about 1 miles east of Tarheel, North Carolina.

Watershed
Phillips Creek drains  of area, receives about 48.9 in/year of precipitation, has a wetness index of 575.45 and is about 30% forested.

See also
List of rivers of North Carolina

References

Rivers of North Carolina
Rivers of Bladen County, North Carolina
Tributaries of the Cape Fear River